Vaamanan  is a 2009 Indian Tamil-language action thriller film written and directed by debutant I. Ahmed, who worked as an erstwhile assistant to Kadhir, and starring Jai, Rahman, Priya Anand, Lakshmi Rai, and Santhanam. Produced by P. Kabilan of Dream Valley Corporation, the film features  Urvashi, Sampath Raj, and Thalaivasal Vijay in supporting roles, with film score and the soundtrack by Yuvan Shankar Raja, while the camera was handled by Arvind Krishna. The film was released on 10 July 2009. This is Priya Anand's first Tamil movie.

Plot
Anand (Jai) is a young, carefree man from Salem who comes to Chennai to stay with his TV journalist friend Chandru (Santhanam) to pursue his dream to become an actor with the help from his newly-found girlfriend Divya (Priya Anand) and Chandru.

Meanwhile, Minister Viduthalai (Delhi Ganesh), who was touted to become the next chief minister, is killed by Minister Anbu Chezhiyan (Sampath Raj), which accidentally gets recorded on tape of an ad film director named Vinoth.

Soon, Anand befriends a famous model named Pooja (Lakshmi Rai), who is also a friend of Vinoth. Vinoth and Lakshmi see the video of the murder and inform the joint commissioner Kailasam (Thalaivasal Vijay), who they come to know is also a hand-in-glove in the murder. Kailasam sends some goons to get the tape, and Vinoth evades. After a long chase, Vinoth gets killed in the train where Anand and Divya were travelling. Anand, having witnessed the murder, places the tape into Divya's bag, which she misses in the train. Anand then develops a friendship with her after this.

Anand, in an urge to become an actor, observes the character of people with a strange attitude. One such person is John Vijay (Rahman). Anand joins John, who, in turn, promises to make him an actor. John takes Anand to a stranger's home and does things as if they were thieves. One such house was that of Pooja, where they go and get information regarding her. On that eve, Anand befriends Pooja when he saves her when she was laid in a pool of blood after being attacked by goons. She helps him become an actor and asks for some photos of his to get him a chance. When Anand goes to Pooja's home, he finds her dead and is put to blame as he was the one present.

At last, it is known that John has used Anand and had also committed this cold-blooded murder. However, Kailasam is after Anand and the tape, and finally, Anand reminds himself that the tape was accidentally put in Divya's handbag in the train at the scene of Vinoth's murder. Anand immediately goes to Divya's house and is mistaken by Divya and her mother (Urvashi). He explains to them that Vinoth and Pooja were killed because of Viduthalai's murder getting recorded on their tape, which accidentally ended up in Divya's handbag at the scene of Vinoth's murder. Both Divya and her mother now realize that Anand is really innocent when Divya gives Anand the tape, which eventually falls into the right hands, that of Gopi (Gopinath), Vinoth and Pooja's media friend, who obtains and publicizes it.

In the end, John, Anbu Chezhiyan, and Kailasam are all killed, and Anand has become a real-life hero instead of an acting hero.

Cast

 Jai as Anand
 Rahman as John Vijay
 Priya Anand as Divya
 Lakshmi Rai as Pooja
 Santhanam as Chandru
 Urvashi as Divya's mother
 Sampath Raj as Minister Anbu Chezhiyan
 Thalaivasal Vijay as Commissioner Kailasam
 Delhi Ganesh as Minister Viduthalai
 Rohini as Rohini
 Gopinath as Gopi
 Shanmugarajan as Sivan
 R. Ravendran as Mukhil

Soundtrack

The soundtrack album of Vaamanan, composed by director Ahmed's friend Yuvan Shankar Raja, was released on 9 April 2009 at Sathyam Cinemas in Chennai. The album features 5 songs with lyrics written by the lyricist Na. Muthukumar. The romance songs "Aedho Saigirai" and "Oru Devathai" were amongst the year's most popular songs.

Production

Development
In May 2008, it was reported, that a film titled Marainthirunthu Paarkum Marmam Enna, which is derived from a song from the 1968 Sivaji Ganesan-starrer Thillana Mohanambal, will be launched soon with actor Jeeva in the lead role. The film was to be directed by newcomer Ahmed with music scored by Yuvan Shankar Raja and cinematography by Arvind Krishna. However, no more news regarding the film came out until it was announced that the same director will direct the film, which was then renamed to Vaamanan with actor Jai in the lead and again with the support of Yuvan Shankar Raja and Arvind Krishna as the music composer and cinematographer respectively.

Filming
The film was launched on 10 September 2008 at Krishnaveni House, Chennai. The major parts of the film were shot in various places in India. The filming was first held in Chennai and later in Coimbatore, Saalakkudi and Hyderabad. Other important scenes and the songs were filmed in foreign countries also like in  Thailand (Bangkok), United States (New Jersey), South Africa, Malaysia and Singapore.

As an interesting aspect, an RC Helicopter (Radio-controlled helicopter) is being used for filming, the first time ever in a South Indian Film. The film carries a special thanks in the title card to the senior actor, Ajith Kumar, who assisted in helping fix a problem encountered with the helicopter.

Controversy
In March 2009, the lead actor Jai ran into trouble for making controversial comments about the potential box office fare of his future films. The actor, who was filming for Vaamanan, Aval Peyar Thamizharasi, Adhe Neram Adhe Idam and Arjunan Kadhali at the time, revealed that only Vaamanan would do well and the rest would become financial failures. The producer of this film also revealed he wanted to take action against Jai for “making such irresponsible and damaging statements about his own films.” Initially, the council had asked him to complete his pending assignments before he could start work on Venkat Prabhu's Goa, but, the producer of the film, Soundarya Rajinikanth, intervened and bailed Jai out of the ban.

Release
The satellite rights of the film were sold to Sun TV.

Reviews
Oneindia: "The first 30 minutes of the film looks very peppy and interesting and grips you to your seat, before slipping out into a run of the mill usual Kollywood style thriller". Hindu wrote: "Despite its share of improbabilities, if Vaamanan (U/A) manages to impact the viewer to a certain extent it is mainly because of the raciness in the last lap". Rediff wrote: "the script lets off at the intermission, and made it tauter, racier, and with at least a sprinkling of logic". Sify wrote: "What could have been an edge-of-the-seat crime thriller falls flat in the second half due to lack of a proper script and far too many compromises made by the director".

References

External links
 Official website
 

2009 films
2009 action thriller films
2000s Tamil-language films
Indian action thriller films
2009 directorial debut films